Dixy Chicken is a fast food chain that specializes in halal chicken. The company was founded by two British Pakistanis, who offered halal versions of products found in McDonald's and KFC. It is owned by an English company, SABT2 Limited. Dixy Chicken was founded in 1986, and has 110 outlets within the United Kingdom.

There are four in Syria, and one each in France, Norway, United States, Egypt, India, Brunei, Pakistan, and the United Arab Emirates.

History
Dixy Chicken was founded in 1986 by Mohammed "Mo" Chowdhury and Samuel Jackson (Meshoe). It was taken over by the American chain Church's Chicken in February 2008. At the end of 2008, it was acquired by Shakeel Arshad, the current owner.

Food safety and hygiene
The Food Standards Agency lists hygiene ratings for the 73 outlets in the United Kingdom, and 39 have received 4 or 5 stars.

In February 2012, after being open for just two weeks, an outlet in Staffordshire was awarded two out of five stars on Staffordshire Borough Council's Rate My Place food safety inspection scheme, noting numerous issues including 'haphazard' refrigerated food storage methods, infected blood found on the packaging of some cheese slices, inadequate hot water supply and cooked chicken being stored below the required temperature of 63 °C.

In July 2014, the Dixy Chicken food chain had the worst hygiene record across the United Kingdom; a third of the outlets failed to meet "satisfactory levels" of hygiene, and nearly half in London failed to meet satisfactory levels. A worker in a branch in Birmingham was filmed washing their feet in a sink, and another was shut down and fined £10,000, after mouse droppings were discovered. 

A branch in Hackney was also shut down after a rat infestation. In August 2021, Walsall Council closed a branch of Dixy Chicken within their Borough for a widespread rat infestation

See also
 List of fast-food chicken restaurants

References

External links
Dixy Chicken homepage

Chicken chains of the United Kingdom
Fast-food chains of the United Kingdom
1986 establishments in England
Restaurants established in 1986
Halal restaurants
Fast-food poultry restaurants
Pakistani cuisine in the United Kingdom